Original Sin is a concept album performed by Pandora's Box and produced by Jim Steinman. Steinman wrote the majority of this album, although there are a couple of cover versions. It was the group's only album, and was a commercial flop.

Although the album was not a commercial success (except in South Africa), many of the songs have gone platinum with other artists. Steinman is said to have been very proud of the songs on this album, even though Original Sin sold very poorly in comparison with his highest selling albums and songs. The album charted at #43 in Sweden.

The album was rereleased in 2006 along with a DVD featuring the videos for "It's All Coming Back to Me Now" and "Good Girls Go to Heaven (Bad Girls Go Everywhere)", a featurette featuring interviews and performances by Steinman.

Videos
Music videos were produced for the songs "It's All Coming Back to Me Now" and "Good Girls Go to Heaven".

Ken Russell directed the video for "It's All Coming Back to Me Now". It was filmed at Pinewood Studios in Buckinghamshire. Steinman wrote the script, based on Russell's segment in the compilation opera movie Aria. Elements include leather, snakes, tombstones and cockrings with shrunken heads, and the video featured Caswell as a girl near death—from a motorcycle crash—being ministered to by paramedics, fantasising and being 'sexually aroused by a large python and writhing on a bed that lit up in time with the music, while surrounded by a group of bemused, semi-naked dancers'. When Steinman's manager saw it, he responded 'It's a porno movie!' The two-day shoot ran over schedule and budget, costing £35,000 an hour. Russell and Steinman even designed a sequence where a motorcyclist would cycle up the steps of a local church-tower, jump out of the turrets at the top, and then explode; alas, the wardens of the church refused permission.

The video for "Good Girls Go to Heaven", directed by Brian Grant, was set in a prison. It shows the arrival of a new inmate called Jenny (the name featured in the first chorus) and her induction. As the song begins, the other inmates dance around her. As the prison is signposted as "Pandora's House Of Detention", matching the phrasing in the song "City Night" from Jim Steinman's Neverland / Bat 2100, we can assume this video was intended to depict something within Steinman's "Obsidian" mythos (the 40+ year project which culminated with Bat Out of Hell The Musical). The only member of Pandora's Box to appear in the video is Ellen Foley (and only as part of the dance ensemble) - although vocals for this song were performed by Holly Sherwood, not Ellen Foley.

Track listings and cover versions

Steinman regularly reworked previous material for a newer project, and much of Original Sin was recycled, as listed in the table below. Some demo versions of tracks recorded by others are listed. Some tracks were intended to be released on The Dream Engine's debut album.

Rory Dodd mostly contributed background vocals and his voice was barely distinguishable in the songs, unlike that of Fire Inc, where he is definitely more audible in the background. Todd Rundgren also helped out with the background vocals this time. Another Bat Out of Hell veteran who contributed with her voice was Ellen Foley.

Note: When the song Safe Sex was released as a single, it was released under the title "Safe Sex (When It Comes 2 Loving U)".

Personnel

Pandora's Box
 Elaine Caswell – Vocals
 Ellen Foley – Vocals
 Holly Sherwood – Vocals
 Gina Taylor – Vocals
 Deliria Wilde – Vocals
 Jim Steinman – Keyboards

Band
 Eddie Martinez – Guitars
 Steve Buslowe – Bass Guitar
 Tony Levin — Bass on "Original Sin (The Natives Are Restless Tonight)"
 Roy Bittan – Grand Piano
 Steven Margoshes — Piano on "Pray Lewd"
 Jeff Bova – Synthesizers, Keyboards, Programming
 Jimmy Bralower – Drums, Programming
 Todd Rundgren, Eric Troyer, Rory Dodd, Holly Sherwood, Laura Theodore – Backing Vocals
 Curtis King, Tawatha Agee, Vaneese Thomas, Brenda King, Darryl Tookes – Additional Backing Vocals
 New York Philharmonic (conducted by Steven Margoshes) — Orchestra on "The Opening of the Box"

2006 Special Edition re-issue
In the slipstream of the release of Meat Loaf's Bat Out of Hell III: The Monster Is Loose, Virgin / EMI released a two disc special edition. The first disc contains the remastered original album, while the second disc is a DVD, containing the two promo videos, and some additional promotional footage.

DVD track listing
 "Jim Steinman Opens Pandora's Box" – 18:18 
 "Prologue (A Teenager In Love)" (video) – 0:58
 "It's All Coming Back to Me Now" (video) – 6:38
 "Good Girls Go to Heaven (Bad Girls Go Everywhere)" (video) – 6:12

DVD credits
 Produced and Directed by Mark Wightwick, Executive Producer: Sue Winter
 Directed by Ken Russell, produced by Vasconcellos
 Directed by Ken Russell, produced by Vasconcellos
 Directed by Brian Grant, produced by Jonathan Cooke

DVD Produced by Abbey Road Interactive

References

External links
MusicMoz

1989 debut albums
Albums produced by Jim Steinman
Albums produced by Roy Bittan
Concept albums
Pop rock albums by American artists
Symphonic rock albums
Virgin Records albums